Mark Corvo (born 17 June 1973) is an Australian former professional rugby league footballer who played as a prop-forward for the Canberra Raiders, Adelaide Rams and the Brisbane Broncos in the NRL.

Background
Corvo was born in Canberra, ACT, Australia.

His brother, Alex Corvo, also played for the Canberra Raiders.

Playing career
Corvo made his first grade debut for Canberra against Penrith in Round 2 1993.  In 1997, Corvo joined Adelaide at the height of the Super League war and played in the club's final ever game which was a 34–20 loss against Newcastle.  In 1999, Corvo rejoined Canberra spending 2 seasons there before signing with defending premiers Brisbane in 2001 before retiring.

Career playing statistics

Point scoring summary

Matches played

References

1973 births
Living people
Adelaide Rams players
Australian rugby league players
Australian expatriate sportspeople in England
Brisbane Broncos players
Canberra Raiders players
Rugby league players from Canberra
Rugby league props
Salford Red Devils players